HMS G4 was a British G-class submarine built for the Royal Navy during World War I.

Description
The G-class submarines were designed by the Admiralty in response to a rumour that the Germans were building double-hulled submarines for overseas duties. They displaced  on the surface and  submerged. The G-class submarines had a crew of 30 officers and ratings. They had a partial double hull.

For surface running, the boats were powered by two  Vickers two-stroke diesel engines, each driving one propeller shaft. When submerged, each propeller was driven by a  electric motor. They could reach  on the surface and  underwater.

The boats were intended to be armed with one 21-inch (53.3 cm) torpedo tube in the bow and two 18-inch (45 cm) torpedo tubes on the beam. This was revised, however, while they were under construction, the 21-inch tube was moved to the stern and two additional 18-inch tubes were added in the bow. They carried two 21-inch and eight 18-inch torpedoes. The G-class submarines were also armed with a single  deck gun.

Career
After commissioning, G4 was sent to join 11th Submarine Flotilla at Blyth.

On 19 June 1916, G4 was patrolling in the Kattegat when she encountered the German merchant ship SS Ems, carrying a load of oil, zinc and copper plates from Oslo to Lübeck, and stopped her with a warning shot. Once the German ship's crew had abandoned ship, G4 fired two torpedo at Ems, both of which missed, and then sank the merchant ship with gunfire. A second German merchantman escaped to neutral Swedish waters. Sweden protested about the sinking of Ems, claiming that it took place within Swedish territorial waters, but Britain denied this. The dispute between Sweden and Britain about the sinking of Ems was still ongoing at the end of the war. At some point between 20 August 1916 and 3 October 1916, she went to Scapa Flow and left there to go to Murmansk (then called Romanov), arriving on 20 October 1916. She left there on 15 November, arriving in Kirkwall five days later. G4 then spent the rest of the First World War conducting patrols in the North Sea from Blyth, and was there at the time of the armistice.

Notes

References
 
 
 
 

 

British G-class submarines
World War I submarines of the United Kingdom
Ships built in Chatham
Royal Navy ship names
1915 ships